Tatsuya Fukumuro, better known as Nhato or kyu, is a Japanese electronic dance music producer from Tokyo. He is associated with the label Otographic Music.

Some of his work includes remixes of music from Touhou Project.

While he started making trance, his style is more reminiscent of Dubstep and House now. He's also a regular on different labels such as Massive CircleZ, and more recently in HARDCORE TANO*C. He also released "Star Trail" for beatmania IIDX.

Discography 
 Fuhaku/Raihaku (2009)
 Rouge for Lips EP (2009)
 Tokyo Blue Pipe (2010)
 Far East Garden (2011)
 Etude (2012)
 Eureka/Past and Then (2013)
 Rinne EP (2017)
 Trace of Will (2019)

References

External links 

 Soundcloud page

Electronic dance music DJs
Japanese DJs
Japanese trance musicians
Living people
Musicians from Tokyo
Remixers
Year of birth missing (living people)